Victorian Turkish bath or simply Turkish bath (though not to be confused with the traditional baths in Turkey and the Ottoman Empire) is a type of public bathhouse which was derived from the hammam (bathhouse) of the Islamic world and those Roman baths which used hot dry air. It became popular as a therapy, a method of cleansing, and a place for relaxation during the Victorian era, rapidly spreading through the British Empire, the United States of America, and Western Europe.

Description 
Unlike Russian saunas (banya), which use steam, Victorian Turkish baths focus on air. The particular bathing process roughly parallels ancient Roman bathing practices. It starts with relaxation in a room heated by a continuous flow of hot, dry air, allowing the bather to perspire freely. Bathers may then move to an even hotter room before they wash in cold water. After performing a full body wash and receiving a massage, bathers finally retire to the cooling-room for a period of relaxation. Unlike a hammam, Victorian Turkish baths use hot, dry air; in the Islamic hammam the air is often steamy. The bather in a Victorian Ottoman bath will often take a plunge in a cold pool after the hot rooms; the Islamic hammam usually does not have a pool unless the water is flowing from a spring. In the Islamic hammams, the bathers splash themselves with cold water. The Victorian Turkish bath was described by Johann Ludwig Wilhelm Thudichum in a lecture to the Royal Society of Medicine given in 1861, one year after the first such bath was opened in London:

History 
By the mid 19th century, baths and wash houses in Britain took several forms. Turkish baths were introduced by David Urquhart, diplomat and sometime Member of Parliament for Stafford, who for political and personal reasons wished to popularise Turkish culture. In 1850, he wrote The Pillars of Hercules, a book about his travels in 1848 through Spain and Morocco. He described the system of dry hot-air baths used there and in the Ottoman Empire, which had changed little since Roman times. In 1856, Richard Barter read Urquhart's book and worked with him to construct a bath. Although this was not a success, Barter persevered, sending his architect to study the ancient baths in Rome. Later that year he opened the first modern Turkish bath at St Ann's Hydropathic Establishment near Blarney, County Cork, Ireland. The following year, the first public bath of its type to be built in mainland Britain since Roman times was opened in Manchester, and the idea spread rapidly. It reached London in July 1860, when Roger Evans, a member of one of Urquhart's Foreign Affairs Committees, opened a Turkish bath at 5 Bell Street, near Marble Arch.

During the following 150 years, over 800 Turkish baths opened in the country, including those built by municipal authorities as part of swimming pool complexes, taking advantage of the fact that water-heating boilers were already on site.

Similar baths opened in other parts of the British Empire. Dr. John Le Gay Brereton, who had given medical advice to bathers in a Foreign Affairs Committee-owned Turkish bath in Bradford, travelled to Sydney, Australia, and opened a Turkish bath there on Spring Street in 1859, even before such baths had reached London.  Canada had one by 1869, and the first in New Zealand was opened in 1874.

Urquhart's influence was also felt outside the Empire when in 1861, Dr Charles H Shepard opened the first Turkish baths in the United States at 63 Columbia Street, Brooklyn Heights, New York City, most probably on 3 October 1863. Before that, the United States, like many other places, had several Russian baths, one of the first being that opened in 1861 by M. Hlasko at his "natatorium" at 219 S. Broad Street, Philadelphia. In Germany in 1877, Frederick I, Grand Duke of Baden opened the Friedrichsbad Roman-Irish baths in Baden-Baden. This was also based on the Victorian Turkish bath, and is still open today.

 there were just eleven Victorian or Victorian-style Turkish baths remaining open in Britain, but hot-air baths still thrive in the form of the Russian steambath and the Finnish sauna.  A few of nineteenth century Britain's Turkish baths, while retaining much of their structure, are now used for other purposes, such as restaurants, events venues and business centres.

See also 

 Banya (sauna)
 Thermae

References

Primary bibliography
 (Deals only with the Victorian Turkish bath)
 (Deals only with the Victorian Turkish bath)

External links

Victorian Turkish baths: their origin, development, & gradual decline

Bathing
Sauna
Public baths